Cine Gibi: O Filme is a 2004 Brazilian animated anthology film directed by José Márcio Nicolosi, based on the Monica's Gang comic books by Mauricio de Sousa. It was released theatrically in Brazil on 9 July 2004.

Plot
Several comic stories are transformed into animations with the help of a machine invented by the character Franklin. These stories are:

 Quest for Isabelle's Nose (Em Busca do Nariz de Isabelle): Monica is setting up a 5000-piece puzzle, but gets stressed when the last piece is missing: Isabelle's nose. She then looks for Mr. Ding Ling, the salesman, and discovers that the last piece of the puzzle of Isabelle's portrait is hidden in the subsoil of the Limoeiro neighborhood, and with the help of Jimmy Five, she goes in search of that last fragment.
 Beauty Contest (Concurso de Beleza): Jimmy Five and Smudge explain to Monica that have a beauty contest in Limoeiro neighborhood, all the girls would participate and all the boys would vote. But they wanted to make a "marmalade" so they would not hurt.
 A Bucktoothed Love Story (Um Amor Dentuço): Jimmy Five and Smudge scoff Monica and begin to run away from it, she runs after them but tire quickly and give up. Suddenly, a vampire emerges wanting to turn Monica into a vampire, then he bites her without her noticing and she slowly turns into a vampire.
 The Samsonbuster (O Caça-Sansão): Monica's stuffed rabbit Samson is the victim of the invention of a mad scientist, and he becomes a huge monster. It is up to Jimmy Five capture it and return it to Monica in his original form.
 A Scenario for My Little Dolls (Um Cenário Para os Meus Bonequinhos): Smudge and Jimmy Five give wings to the imagination in charming children's games. By the time they arrive Monica and Maggy, they decide to give a feminine touch to the fun.
 Brother Smudge (Irmão Cascão): Jimmy Five decides to name his best friend as brother. He just did not have loose way of Smudge, which will occupy all the spaces of your home.

Cast
 Marli Bortoletto as Monica
 Angélica Santos as Jimmy Five
 Elza Gonçalves as Maggy
 Paulo Cavalcante as Smudge
 Mauricio de Sousa as Blu
 Sibele Toledo as Franklin

Guest stars
The film features the following live-action guest stars:
 Mauricio de Sousa
 Luciano Huck
 Wanessa Camargo
 Fernanda Lima
 Pedro e Thiago

External links
 

Monica's Gang films
2004 films
2004 animated films
2004 comedy films
2004 fantasy films
2004 science fiction films
2000s adventure comedy films
2000s children's adventure films
2000s children's animated films
2000s children's comedy films
2000s fantasy adventure films
2000s fantasy comedy films
2000s Portuguese-language films
2000s science fiction adventure films
2000s science fiction comedy films
Animated adventure films
Animated anthology films
Animated comedy films
Animated films based on comics
Animated science fantasy films
Brazilian adventure comedy films
Brazilian animated science fiction films
Brazilian anthology films
Brazilian fantasy comedy films
Brazilian science fiction comedy films
Films with live action and animation
Paramount Pictures animated films
Paramount Pictures films